Wei Yan (died October 234), courtesy name Wenchang, was a Chinese military general and politician of the state of Shu Han during the Three Kingdoms period of China. Originally a subordinate of the warlord Liu Bei in the late Eastern Han dynasty, Wei Yan rose through the ranks and became a general when Liu Bei seized control of Yi Province (covering present-day Sichuan and Chongqing) in 214. His performance in battle helped him to become a prominent figure in the Shu military in a short period of time. He was later appointed as the Administrator of Hanzhong Commandery and as an Area Commander in 219. Between 228 and 234, he participated actively in the Northern Expeditions led by the Shu regent Zhuge Liang against Shu's rival state, Cao Wei. After Zhuge Liang's death in September 234, Wei Yan was killed by another Shu general, Ma Dai, for alleged treason.

Early life 
Wei Yan was from Yiyang Commandery, which covered parts of present-day Nanyang in southern Henan and parts of northern Hubei. He started his career as a foot soldier under the warlord Liu Bei, probably sometime between 209 and 211 when Liu Bei was in southern Jing Province (covering present-day Hubei and Hunan). Around 212, he followed Liu Bei into Yi Province (covering present-day Sichuan and Chongqing) and served Liu Bei as a personal retainer in a war against Liu Zhang, the Governor of Yi Province (益州牧). Huang Zhong and Wei Yan scored many military exploits during the capture of Guanghan County. Thus, Wei Yan promoted to full general.

Although the campaign met early success with the quick death of Gao Pei and Yang Huai and the later occupation of the passes followed by the defeat of Liu Zhang's reinforcement at Fu County. Pang Tong was killed during the siege of Luo castle and the It became a prolonged one. One year later, Wei Yan and Liu Bei finally captured Luocheng, then surrounded and occupied Chengdu together with Zhuge Liang, Zhang Fei along with others. Thus, around summer 214, Liu Bei seized control of Yi Province from Liu Zhang. As Wei Yan has made several contributions in the campaign of Yi, Liu Bei promoted him to the rank of General of Ivory Gate.

Administrator of Hanzhong 
In 219, Wei Yan participated in Liu Bei campaign against his rival Cao Cao in the Hanzhong Campaign. After Liu Bei captured Hanzhong, Liu Bei asked his subjects to nominate one of his generals to remain behind and guard Hanzhong. His subjects nominated Zhang Fei, who also strongly believed that he would most likely be chosen. However, much to everyone's surprise, Liu Bei chose Wei Yan instead and appointed him as General Who Guards Distant Lands and acting Administrator of Hanzhong. When Liu Bei asked Wei Yan in front of everyone how would he perform his duty, the latter confidently replied:

During his tenure, Wei Yan explained to Liu Bei that he borrowed a strategy which were called the "double gates" (重门之计). This strategy adopted from the ancient text I Chingdescribed it as a particularly designed fortifications which laid numerous military garrisons surrounding the outskirt and trail exits linking to Hanzhong.

Following the end of the Eastern Han dynasty and the start of the Three Kingdoms period in 220, Liu Bei declared himself emperor in 221 and established the state of Shu Han (or Shu) to challenge the legitimacy of the Cao Wei (or Wei) state established by Cao Cao's successor, Cao Pi, to replace the Eastern Han dynasty. Liu Bei further promoted Wei Yan to General Who Guards the North after his coronation.

Northern Expeditions

After Liu Bei died in 223, his son Liu Shan succeeded him as the emperor of Shu. In the same year, Liu Shan enfeoffed Wei Yan as a Marquis of a Chief Village.

In 227, Zhuge Liang, the Imperial Chancellor of Shu, mobilised the Shu military and gathered troops in Hanzhong Commandery in preparation for a large-scale invasion of Shu's rival state, Cao Wei (or Wei), where he put Wei Yan in charge of the vanguard division and appointed him as acting Major under the Imperial Chancellor and acting Inspector of Liang Province. During this campaign, Wei Yan always requested to lead a separate detachment of 10,000 troops, take a different route and rendezvous with the Shu main army at Tong Pass (潼關; in present-day Tongguan County, Shaanxi).

Wei Yan argued that The valley and the people in it has sufficient food supply which can support the operation at least for a week. However, Zhuge Liang rejected the plan because he thought that it was too risky, which prompted Wei Yan to scold Zhuge Liang as a coward and complained that his talent was not put to good use. When Chen Shou compiled the unofficial works on the history of Shu to write the Sanguozhi, he only mentioned that Wei Yan suggested to Zhuge Liang to split the Shu army into two, and the two forces would take two different routes and rendezvous at Tong Pass.

Later in 230, during the Ziwu Campaign, Wei Yan led some troops towards Yangxi (陽谿; southwest of present-day Wushan County, Gansu) and engaged the Wei forces led by and Guo Huai and Fei Yao, where Wei Yan managed to inflict a heavy defeat to them. Also, during the same year, he assisted another Shu general Wu Yi, both of them were ordered to attack Nan'an Commandery (南安郡; southeast of present-day Longxi County, Gansu) where they scored another victory against Wei's army led by Fei Yao.

During the fourth campaign in 231, Wei Yan was also involved in the Battle of Mount Qi when he together with the Shu generals Gao Xiang and Wu Ban, scored a major victory against the Wei army led by Sima Yi, where they killed 3,000 Wei soldiers and seized 5,000 sets of armour and 3,100 crossbows. Sima Yi was forced to retreat back to his camp. Zhang He, a veteran Wei general was also killed in battle during this conflict. As a reward for his contributions, the Shu government promoted Wei Yan to Vanguard Military Adviser and Senior General Who Attacks the West, and elevated him from a village marquis to a county marquis under the title "Marquis of Nanzheng".

Battle of Wuzhang Plains

In 234, Zhuge Liang launched the fifth Shu invasion of Wei, with Wei Yan leading the Shu vanguard force as one of his commanding officer, Wei Yan  reportedly had a dream that on the top of his head would grow a horn, he asked the meaning of this to the dream diviner Zhao Zhi (趙直). Zhao Zhi lied to him and said:

After he left, he revealed to someone that the word "horn" (角) is composed of a "knife" (刀) with "use" (用) below it, which mean dreaming of "using knife" atop one person head and were considered as extremely ominous omen. Later, in the encampment Wei Yan had a quarrel with Yang Yi, Zhuge Liang's chief clerk, as Wei Yan was extremely resentful of Yang Yi. Whenever they got into heated quarrels, Wei Yan often drew his sword and brandished it in front of Yang Yi who sobbed as tears rolled down his cheeks; which prompted Fei Yi then to stepped in to stop them from fighting and managed to keep them under control until Zhuge Liang's death. Zhuge Liang was upset by the lack of harmony between Wei Yan and Yang Yi, but was unwilling to side with either of them because he appreciated the talents of both men.

When Zhuge Liang became critically ill during the invasion, he gave secret orders to Yang Yi, Fei Yi and Jiang Wei to lead the army back to Shu after his death, with Wei Yan in charge of the rearguard and Jiang Wei to follow behind, and being instructed If Wei Yan refused to follow the order, they were to retreat without him. When Zhuge Liang died, news of his death were kept secret. Yang Yi sent Fei Yi to meet Wei Yan and assess his intentions. Wei Yan told Fei Yi:

Wei Yan then asked Fei Yi to assist him in making arrangements for part of the Shu army to remain behind and continue with the campaign, while the rest would retreat back to Shu. Fei Yi pretended to write a letter, signed by both of them, and told Wei Yan that he would read out the letter to all the officers about the new arrangements, where he lied by telling Wei Yan that he will go back and explain Wei Yan answer to Yang Yi.

Death
Wei Yan then let Fei Yi leave, but he immediately regretted his decision and went after Fei Yi, although Wei Yan could not catch up Fei Yi in time. He then sent his subordinate to meet Yang Yi and the others, but was shocked to discover that all units were preparing to retreat in accordance with Zhuge Liang's final orders. Wei Yan wanted to continue the battle even though Zhuge Liang had died, so he became furious when he heard of the retreat. He intended to block the Shu forces from retreating, so he led his force towards the south – ahead of the main army under Yang Yi's command – and sealed the return route by destroying the gallery roads leading back to Shu.

Wei Yan and Yang Yi separately wrote memorials to the Shu imperial court to accuse each other, which both memorials arrived in Chengdu on the same day. The Shu emperor Liu Shan asked the ministers Dong Yun and Jiang Wan for their opinions.  Both of them sided with Yang Yi and felt that Wei Yan's actions were suspicious. In the meantime, Yang Yi ordered his men to cut down trees to rebuild the gallery roads, and his troops marched day and night to catch up with Wei Yan. Wei Yan arrived at the southern valley first and ordered his soldiers to attack Yang Yi. Yang Yi sent Wang Ping to resist Wei Yan. Wang Ping shouted at Wei Yan:

As Wei Yan was left with only his son(s) and a few followers, They fled towards Hanzhong Commandery, Yang Yi ordered Ma Dai to give chase and  caught up with Wei Yan. Ma Dai killed Wei Yan, brought his head back, and threw it in front of Yang Yi. Yang Yi trampled on Wei Yan's decapitated head and said:

Thus, the family members and close relatives of Wei Yan were also executed. Before Wei Yan's death, Jiang Wan had led the imperial guards from Chengdu to deal with what appeared to be a mutiny by Wei Yan. They had travelled for about 10 li (about three miles) when they received news of Wei Yan's death; they then turned back and returned to Chengdu.

Character analysis 

Wei Yan was known to treat his soldiers well and for his bravery with valor that surpassed others, although he was also boastful of his talents hence his peers tended to avoid him. Sun Quan, the ruler of Wu and another contemporary figure of three kingdoms era, has remarked that the moment Zhuge Liang passed away, Wei Yan will be proven unreliable. Chen Shou, who wrote Wei Yan's biography in the Sanguozhi, analysed Wei Yan's death as such:  Chen Shou also remarked that Zhuge Liang himself highly valued Wei Yan bravery and caught in dilemma when the latter had conflict with Yang Yi, ration and transportation staff officer which talent in managing his duties Zhuge Liang also valued.

A similar, but somewhat different and more detailed account exists in the historical text Weilüe work by later Wei dynasty historian named Yu Huan stated that Zhuge Liang told Wei Yan to setting up defense, although he also gave further instruction to "not return here". Wei Yan kept this order for himself and did not share with others, thus prompting Wei Yan's rival, Yang Yi, to spread false rumours that Wei Yan has intended to defect to the enemy, which led the incited Shu soldiers to attack Wei Yan and killing him. However, Pei Songzhi, who added the Weilüe account to Wei Yan's biography and annotated the Sanguozhi, doubted the Weilüe account as he remarked:

Furthermore, modern era historical analysis stated that Wei Yan's death was explained in political terms in Injustice to Wei Yan, a neoteric article by Zhu Ziyan, a history professor from Shanghai University, where Zhu wrote that Zhuge Liang personally appointed Jiang Wan, Fei Yi and Jiang Wei to be his successors, but Wei Yan's appointments and contributions were greater than those of any of them at the time. Zhuge Liang ostracised Wei Yan and cracked down on him because he wanted to eliminate Wei Yan as a possible obstacle to his appointed successors.<ref name="Zhu Ziyan">{{cite web |last1=Ziyan |first1=Zhu |title=Injustice to Wei Yan (魏延的千古奇冤) |url=http://www.qulishi.com/news/201405/13854.html |website=quilishi |publisher=quilishi |access-date=20 January 2022 |language=zh |date=2014 |quote=诸葛亮亲自指定了接班人，蒋琬、费袆、姜维。但是魏延的官职、功劳要比他们个人大得多，诸葛亮打击魏延，排挤魏延是为他的接班人扫除障碍，去掉绊脚石}}</ref>

Meanwhile, in the Analysis of the Three Kingdoms, Yi Zhongtian commented that Zhuge Liang's last order to forcibly retreat and leave Wei Yan alone was contradicted by what he personally instructed Wei Yan, such contradiction indirectly leading to the tragedy between Wei Yan and Yang Yi. Hence the forcible retreat might be the idea of Yang Yi, not Zhuge Liang, since Zhuge Liang died before devising any withdrawal plan, thus prompted Yi Zhongtian to theorized that there was no evidence of this theory that Yang Yi fabricated the order. Yi Zhongtian also explained another possible hypothesis that Zhuge Liang's final order "leave Wei Yan alone" simply meant "ignore Wei Yan", did not mean "kill Wei Yan". Shu Han's main forces must withdraw to guard the rear area, and if Wei Yan could not be stopped then just let him be. Yi Zhongtian analized and criticize that Wei Yan did not grasp the political-economical reasons behind both of Zhuge Liang's expeditions and his extreme caution. Zhuge Liang launched the expeditions not only to restore the Han dynasty, but also to keep Shu Han in warring conditions and used that to increase his control over the internal affair and suppress the potential dissidents amongst local nobility.

As smallest and weakest amongst the Three Kingdoms, Shu Han would be the first one to be targeted at, hence it had to make pre-emptive attacks to intimidate the opponents, to enlarge its territory and to improve its conditions - the rate of success was not high but it was better than doing nothing. Zhuge Liang's goal of Han restoration was sincere and never changed, however the powerful Cao Wei could not be defeated quickly in one single blow, hence the expeditions must be done in a careful manner with guaranteed advances rather than daring but risky strikes which could lead to disasters like Xiaoting or Fancheng. Such a complicated situation could not be explained clearly to Wei Yan, and probably it did not need to be, as Zhuge Liang wanted to keep Wei Yan's spirit at its highest.

Ziwu Valley plan analysis
Wei Yan's reasoning for his Ziwu Valley Plan was recorded in the Weilüe, which was then added as an annotation to his biography in the Sanguozhi, where Chen Shou recorded that Wei Yan received intelligence that the defender of the strategic city Chang'an, that he judged Xiahou Mao, as incompetent commander. Thus, Wei Yan reasoned, it would be easy for him to take 5,000 troops (and another 5,000 to carry supplies) across the Qin Mountains via the Ziwu Valley (子午谷) and into Chang'an. Wei Yan estimated that he would reach Chang'an in ten days and scare Xiahou Mao into flight, leaving the grain in Chang'an's storehouses for Shu's taking. There, Wei Yan's force can wait for Zhuge Liang's main army to take the safer road out of Xie Valley (斜谷) and rendezvous in Chang'an. In this way, the region west of Xianyang could be conquered in one movement." Weilue argued the possibility of Ziwu valley plans, as although the plan of Wei Yan could have been worked since although Sima Yi intelligence has acknowledged the plan, Xiahou Mao, who at that time was the commander of Chang'an did not realize it.

When the Wei government received intelligence about Wei Yan's Ziwu Valley Plan, the Wei emperor Cao Rui immediately removed Xiahou Mao from his military command in Chang'an and reassigned him to be a Master of Writing in Luoyang. Yi Zhongtian in his Analysis of the Three Kingdoms commented that both proponents and opponents of Wei Yan's plan have their own good reasons. Cao Wei met the first Northern Expedition with little preparation as they didn't fathom that Shu Han could make such an offensive, hence the combination of Zhuge Liang and Wei Yan's strikes could results in huge impact. However, Wei Yan's plan was also very risky, as neither the flight Xiahou Mao or his subordinates nor the timely arrival of Zhuge Liang's main forces was guaranteed, moreover the formidable Guo Huai was also in nearby region and could come to assist Xiahou Mao.

However, recent scholarship of Chinese history criticized the account of Yu Huan in his Weilue work that Yu Huan has exaggerated the alleged conflict between Wei Yan with his superior, Zhuge Liang, regarding the rejection of the latter for the strategy which proposed by Wei Yan. Wen-Chin Wang from Department of Chinese Language and Literature has suspected the bias of Yu Huan personal view which he viewed Yu Huan as Wei supporter, where Wei kingdom during the late Han era were the arch enemy of Shu kingdom.

 Legacy 
 Military fortification 
The "Heavy Gate" (重门之计) bulwark which designed by Wei Yan during his tenure as administrator of Hanzhong particularly came to use twice when used by the successor administrator of Hanzhong. And greatly helped Wang Ping, to defend the province from a massive invasion led by Cao Shuang. Later, Jiang Wei, the grand commandant of Shu kingdom dismantled this "Heavy Gate" fortification which designed by Wei Yan in favor of his own design. However, Jiang Wei's new defense strategy failed to impede the advance of Zhong Hui, general of Wei, while Jiang Wei himself were repelled from Hanzhong effectively causing Hanzhong fall to Wei kingdom.

 Wei Yan Shrines 
A Wei Yan Shrine is located in Baique Village, Sanquan Township, Zitong County, Sichuan. In front of the shrine flows a Wei Family River. On the plains east of the river, there once stood a Wei Family River Temple, which had three stone tablets in front of it. One of the stone tablets bore the words "Wei Yan once led soldiers and was stationed here.". According to legend, in 231, during the fourth Shu invasion of Wei, Zhuge Liang ordered Wei Yan to lead a separate force to station south of the Wei Family River where, in memory of the incident, the locals built the Wei Family River Temple beside the river and a small bridge called "General Bridge". The Wei Yan Shrine was initially demolished by the government but was rebuilt in 1995. A statue of Wei Yan stands in the main hall of the shrine.

There is another temple attributed to Wei Yan in allegedly Wei Yan hometown, in Weijia village Gaobao Township, Qingfeng County, Puyang City, in Henan Province.

In popular cultures

In Romance of the Three Kingdoms
Wei Yan appears as a character in the historical novel Romance of the Three Kingdoms by Luo Guanzhong, which romanticises the historical events leading to, and during the Three Kingdoms period, such as Wei Yan participation in the fictional Battle of Changsha. Wei Yan surrendered to Liu Bei after killing his superior, Han Xuan.

During a clash between Liu Bei against Ma Chao forces, Wei Yan defeat Ma Dai after they duelled for several bouts, causing the latter to flee.

During the battle in ianzhong, Wei Yan and Zhang Fei were unable to overcame Zhang He, causing both to retreat.

According to Zhang Chaoju, Wei Yan were beaten during this campaign by Cao Cao general named Pang De.

Later, during the battle of Wuzhang plains, Wei Yan lured Sima Yi and his two sons, Sima Shi and Sima Zhao into fire ambush. However, suddenly there are heavy raining that caused the fire extinguished and the plan failed, prompting the Simas to escape.

Modern era depictions
“Sun Qi Mountain” drama which was written by Wei Ming-Lun, that described the relationship between two important historical figures Zhuge Liang and Wei Yan depicted the latter in positive light as it was not Wei Yan intent to betray Shu, which making him as tragic hero figure.

Wei Yan is featured as a playable character in Koei's Dynasty Warriors and Warriors Orochi video game series. He also appears in Koei's Dynasty Tactics 2.

 Bibliography 

 Notes 

 References 

 Primary & secondary sources 
 Chen, Shou (3rd century). Records of the Three Kingdoms (Sanguozhi).
 
 
 
 
 
 Pei, Songzhi (5th century). Annotations to Records of the Three Kingdoms (Sanguozhi zhu'').
 
 
 
 

Year of birth unknown
234 deaths
3rd-century executions
Executed people from Henan
Executed Shu Han people
Executed Three Kingdoms people
Generals under Liu Bei
Han dynasty generals from Henan
Han dynasty politicians from Henan
Officials under Liu Bei
Political office-holders in Shaanxi
People executed by a Three Kingdoms state by decapitation
People executed by Shu Han
Shu Han generals
Shu Han politicians